Ludeke is a surname. Notable people with the surname include:

Frans Ludeke (born 1968), South African rugby union coach

See also
Luděk

Surnames